Ali Khreis is a Shia Lebanese member of parliament representing the Sour district. He is part of the Amal Movement led by Nabih Berri.

See also
 Lebanese Parliament
 Members of the 2009-2013 Lebanese Parliament
 Amal Movement

References

Living people
Members of the Parliament of Lebanon
Lebanese Shia Muslims
Amal Movement politicians
Arab League people
1957 births